Hans Prack (born 4 August 1943) is an Austrian sailor. He competed in the Tornado event at the 1976 Summer Olympics.

References

External links
 

1943 births
Living people
Austrian male sailors (sport)
Olympic sailors of Austria
Sailors at the 1976 Summer Olympics – Tornado
Sportspeople from Salzburg